Boston shooting may refer to:
 Boston massacre
 Boston Chinatown massacre
 Boston Marathon bombing

See also 
 Crime in Boston
 List of mass shootings in the United States